Presa may refer to:

 Preša, village in the Municipality of Majšperk in northeastern Slovenia
 Presa Canario, Spanish breed of large dog of mastiff or catch dog type
 Presa-Tusiu, archaeological site in Corsica
 Presa de Montejaque, reservoir in the province of Málaga, Andalusia, Spain
 Prezë, a village in Albania

See also 

 La Presa (disambiguation)